Henry V, Count of Gorizia (died 1362) was a Count of Gorizia from the Meinhardiner dynasty.

He was a son of Count Albert II and his second wife, Euphemia of Mätsch.  In 1338, he and his (half-)brothers Meinhard VI and Albert III inherited the County of Gorizia, which they proceeded to rule jointly.  In 1349, he was appointed captain of Friuli.

Henry V was married to Cigliola, daughter of Duke Jacopo of Carrara.

External links 
 Medieval genealogy

Counts of Gorizia
14th-century births
Year of birth unknown
1362 deaths
14th-century people of the Holy Roman Empire